Thingalkarikkom  is a village in Kollam district in the state of Kerala, India.

Demographics
 India census, Thinkalkarikkakom had a population of 19627 with 9415 males and 10212 females.

References

Villages in Kollam district